The Church of the Intercession of the Holy Virgin is an Orthodox church in Derbent, a city in the Russian Republic of Dagestan. 

The parish belongs to the Makhachkala deanery of the Diocese of Makhachkala of the Russian Orthodox Church. Until 2011 the church belonged to the Diocese of Baku and Azerbaijan. The only surviving Orthodox church in the city.

History
In 1894, the Derbent Orthodox community raised the issue of building a new parochial school. For these purposes, donations were collected and a plot of land in the city center was purchased. The construction of the school began in 1899, and on January 7, 1900, it was solemnly consecrated.

In 1901, an altar was arranged at the school, and it turned into a church-school, which on October 1, 1901 was consecrated by Bishop Vladimir (Sinkovsky) of Vladikavkaz.

In 1902, in the courtyard of the church-school, a new building of the parochial school was built, and the old one was completely given over to the church.

In 1939 the church was closed, but in 1943 it was again handed over to believers.

In the 2000s, a church house and a bell tower were built. On October 14, 2009, Bishop Alexander (Ishchein) of Diocese of Baku and Azerbaijan performed the rite of the consecration of the restored church.

See also
Vladikavkaz and Makhachkala diocese

Notes

Cultural heritage monuments in Derbent
History of Derbent
Objects of cultural heritage of Russia of regional significance
1900 establishments
Religious buildings and structures in Dagestan